Amba Prasad may refer to:
 Amba Prasad (businessman), Indian businessman and philanthropist
 Amba Prasad (politician), Indian politician
 Sufi Amba Prasad, Indian nationalist and pan-Islamist leader